Kantemirovskaya is a Moscow Metro station in Tsaritsyno District, Southern Administrative Okrug, Moscow. It is on the Zamoskvoretskaya Line, between Kashirskaya and Tsaritsyno stations at the intersection of Proletarsky (Proletariat) avenue and Kantemirovskaya street. The station got its name from Kantemirovskaya Street, which in turn was named in honor of the 4th Guards Kantemirovskaya Tank Division.

Kantemirovskaya opened on 30 December 1984 as part of an extension but was closed the very next day because of flooding. It reopened on 9 February 1985.

Kantemirovskaya, having been designed by Rimidalv Pogrebnoy and Vladimir Filippov, is a shallow one-vault station with benches and signs attached to pink marble pillars situated along the center axis of the platform. The walls are faced with brown marble. A set of sculptures by Alexander Kibalnikov is located at one of the platform's ends.

The stations has been closed since 12 November 2022 due to the reconstruction works.

References

Moscow Metro stations
Railway stations in Russia opened in 1984
Zamoskvoretskaya Line
Railway stations located underground in Russia